David "D.W." Griffith is a fictional character appearing in American comic books published by Marvel Comics.  He is depicted as an ally of Luke Cage.

The character was portrayed by Jeremiah Richard Craft in the television series Luke Cage set in the Marvel Cinematic Universe.

Publication history

The character, created by Archie Goodwin and George Tuska, first appeared in Hero for Hire #2 (Aug. 1972).

Fictional character biography
He operated the Gem Theater and rented out a room for Luke Cage when he needed a place to stay. Despite the theater being a constant source of destruction, Griffith remained a faithful friend to Cage mostly because he considered him his only friend. Griffith was also a film student and wanted to produce his own production company. When it seemed that he was going nowhere, Griffith attempted to commit suicide, but a mysterious stranger, implied to be Moon Knight, convinced him not to do himself in and be happy. His theater was used a base for the Mighty Avengers.

In other media
Dave Griffith makes a recurring appearance on Luke Cage played by Jeremiah Richard Craft. He is black, as opposed to Caucasian like in the comics, and is usually seen on the streets attempting to sell bootleg recordings of "The Incident". Cage approached him on the street and asked that he use his eyes to inform him about the goings on. Despite some reluctance, Dave gave in, acting as an informant.  He appears in the episode "You Know My Steez", filming the street fight between Cage and Willis Stryker. He returns in season 2 where he has set up a Luke Cage merchandise store within Pop's Barber Shop, much to Cage and Bobby Fish's chagrin. He follows Cage around by using the Harlem's Hero app and films his many exploits. Following Cage's defeat at the hands of Bushmaster, Griffith begins selling tapes of the fight, despite still admitting support for Cage. Griffith is also present when Danny Rand arrives to visit Cage and he even gets to see him briefly use his powers. While at a party, Griffith and his girlfriend Aisha Axton witness two friends of theirs reacting violently to a drug labeled 'Bushmaster' and inform Cage. When Cage makes a bid to act as the "sheriff" of Harlem, Griffith voices his concern. He ultimately decides to use the money he earned from his Luke Cage gift shop to buy Pop's Barber Shop stating that Harlem needs a Switzerland. He is last seen putting a "Help Wanted" sign up on the window.

References

External links
David Griffith at the Comic Book DB

Characters created by Archie Goodwin (comics)
Characters created by George Tuska
Comics characters introduced in 1972
Luke Cage